The Man Who Woke Up may refer to:

The Man Who Woke Up (1918 film), an American silent film directed by James McLaughlin
The Man Who Woke Up (1921 film), an American short Western film directed by Lee Kohlmar